Royal Léopold FC is a Belgian football club from the city of Brussels. The club once played in the highest division, but later dropped to the provincial series, and now it currently plays in the Belgian Promotion D, the fourth level in Belgian football.

History

Early history
The club was founded on 11 February 1893 by Baron Albert de Bassompierre (1873–1956), making it the oldest active football club in Brussels. The club was named Léopold Football Club in tribute to the king. It was created as a club for the bourgeoisie and nobility in Brussels. On 1 September 1895, Léopold Club was one of the founding members of the UBSSA, the forerunner of the RBFA. The team played in red and white.

The team entered the first-ever official Belgian championship in 1895–96, and remained in the highest division until 1912, when the team finished last and was therefore relegated. So they played the 1912–13 in the second division but managed to finish second, thus rejoining the highest division in 1913–14. However, the team again finished last again in the last season before World War I and never managed to come back to the top level. 

During this time they also participated in the Challenge International du Nord, winning the inaugural edition in 1898 and again in 1899, and then reached the final a further one time in 1901. 

In 1900, the club participated in the first edition of the Coupe Van der Straeten Ponthoz in 1900, regarded by many as the first-ever European club trophy. The tournament was held in Brussels and all matches took place at Léopold FC's home ground, but despite being the hosts, they were knocked-out in the first round by the reigning Dutch champions HVV Den Haag by a resounding 8–1 loss, with a consolation goal from Hendrik van Heuckelum.

Recent history
The club faced many name changes in its history, the last of them following a string of merges to keep the matricule n°5 alive (such as with R.C.S. La Forestoise in 1996 for example); it changed its name to the present one in July 2014.

Honours
 Belgian First Division
 Runner-up (1): 1901–02

Challenge International du Nord
Champions (2): 1898 and 1899
Runner-up (1): 1901

References

External links
 
 RSSSF Archive
 Belgian football clubs history

Association football clubs established in 1893
Football clubs in Brussels
1893 establishments in Belgium
Organisations based in Belgium with royal patronage
Belgian Pro League clubs